Kafayat Oluwatoyin Shafau (born 30 June 1980), popularly known by her stage name Kaffy,  is a Nigerian dancer, choreographer, dance instructor and fitness coach. She is also the founder and owner of Imagneto Dance Company. She is best known for breaking the Guinness World Record for "Longest Dance Party" at the Nokia Silverbird Danceathon in 2006.

Early life and education
Kaffy was born  and raised in Nigeria . She completed her primary education at Chrisland School, Opebi and her secondary school education at Coker Secondary School, Orile-Iganmu before attending Yaba College of Technology for a while and went on to obtain a diploma in data processing and computer science from Olabisi Onabanjo University.

Career
Kaffy's dancing career took off after she went to an event to perform onstage by someone who spotted her when she used to go to the National Stadium during weekends for dance rehearsals and workouts.

In 2006, Kaffy led her dance group to break the Guinness Book of Record for "Longest Dance Party" after they danced for 55hours and 40minutes. She is currently a dance instructor who has developed innovative visualisation-based methods for teaching dance and dance fitness in an accelerated-learning format.

In 2017, she created 'The Dance Workshop ' a dance convention aimed at training and mentoring professional dancers as well as promoting cultural exchange within the Nigerian dance industry. The 2017 Edition featured America's leading choreographer,  AY Hollywood.

Personal life
She was married to Joseph Ameh, the music director and drummer for Nigerian duo P-Square from July 2015 to January 2022. She filed for divorce on the 11th of January 2022. She has two children with him.

Filmography

Dance fitness and instructions
 "9jaDance Burnout"
 "Ijoda9ja Dance Burnout"

Reality television shows
 Malta Guinness Street Dance - (Judge)
 Project Fame West Africa - (Faculty Member)
 Dance with Peter – (Judge and Faculty Instructor)

Music videos
Kaffy is recognized for her dance moves and level of stamina. She has featured in award-winning musical videos for artistes such as Seyi Shay, D'banj, P-Square Olamide Tiwa Savage and some other international top acts.

Awards and nominations

References

External links
 
 

1980 births
Olabisi Onabanjo University alumni
Yaba College of Technology alumni
Yoruba women
Nigerian choreographers
Living people
Nigerian female dancers
Nigerian women company founders